Peter-No-Tail is a 1997 Swedish Live-Action SVT's Christmas calendar TV series initiated by SVT Dramas executive chief Mark Levengood. The series is based on Gösta Knutsson's books and was well received by both children and grownups. The script was written by Pernilla Oljelund.

Some of the actors wore mechanical, remote-controlled tails with their costumes.

Plot 

The series is set at Åsgränd in the town of Uppsala in Sweden, where a group of cats are living. Among them are Pelle Svanslös, Måns and Maja Gräddnos.

Actors 
 Björn Kjellman - Pelle Svanslös
 Cecilia Ljung - Maja Gräddnos
 Christer Fant - Måns
 Leif Andrée - Bill
 Göran Thorell - Bull
 Brasse Brännström - Trisse
 Suzanne Ernrup - Gullan från Arkadien
 Jonas Uddenmyr - Murre från Skogstibble
 Lena-Pia Bernhardsson - Maja Gräddnos mamma
 Anna Norberg - Frida
 Lakke Magnusson - Fritz
 Jonathan Dehnisch - Fridolf
 Julia Dehnisch - Fridolfina
 Peter Harryson - Pettersson
 Ulla Akselson - Gammel-Maja
 Björn Granath - Konrad
 Lars Dejert - Tusse Batong
 Claes Månsson - Karl-Erik, kalkonen
 Henry Bronett - Taxen Max
 Reuben Sallmander - Frösö-Frasse
 Ecke Olsson - Ville med sillen
 Katarina Ewerlöf - Mirjam, societetskatt
 Fransesca Quartey - Monique, societetskatt
 Anders Beckman - Långe John
 Gösta Prüzelius - Berättaren

Video 
The series was released to VHS in 1998, and to DVD on 19 November 2001.

References

External links 
  at SVT Play 
 
 
 

1997 films
Films based on radio series
Swedish children's films
1997 Swedish television series debuts
1997 Swedish television series endings
Sveriges Television's Christmas calendar
Television shows based on children's books
1990s Swedish films